This is a list of settlements in Guyana. The following definitions have been used:
Town: Defined by the government of Guyana as 'municipalities'.
Village As defined by official government documents, census or gazetteers.
Community: A settlement unlisted on government documents.
Neighbourhood: Subdivisions of any of the above.
Estate: Contiguous agricultural holding that is notable enough to have a Wikipedia article.
Mission: Any such that is notable enough to have a Wikipedia article.

Cities
Georgetown - Capital

Towns

Anna Regina (Regional capital)
Bartica (Regional capital)
Corriverton
Lethem (Regional capital)
Linden (Regional capital)
Mabaruma (Regional capital)
New Amsterdam (Regional capital)
Rose Hall

Villages

A–M

Achiwib
Adventure
Agatash
Aishalton
Albion
Annai
Annandale, Demerara-Mahaica
Annandale, Pomeroon-Supenaam
Apoteri
Aranaputa
Assakata
Baracara
Baramita
Belfield
Belladrum
Beterverwagting
Better Hope
Burma
Buxton
Campbelltown
Canal No.2
Charity
Clonbrook
Cove and John
Crabwood Creek
Den Amstel
Enmore
Enterprise
Esau and Jacob
Fort Wellington (Regional capital)
Hackney
Hampton Court
Helena
Hiawa
Hosororo
Hyde Park
Imbaimadai
Issano
Isseneru
Ituni
Kabakaburi
Kamarang
Kamwatta Hill
Kanashen
Karasabai
Karaudarnau
Kartabo
Kasuela
Koriabo
Kumaka, Barima-Waini
Kumaka, East Berbice-Corentyne
Kuru Kururu
Kurupukari
Kurupung
Kwakwani
Kwebanna
Leonora
Liliendaal
Lima Sands
Lusignan
Mahaica
Mahdia (Regional capital)
Maruranau
Matthew's Ridge
Met-en-Meerzorg
Micobie
Moleson Creek
Monkey Mountain
Morawhanna

N–Z

Nabaclis
Nappi
Non Pariel
Onderneeming
Orealla
Paramakatoi
Parika
Plaisance
Pickersgill
Port Kaituma
Port Mourant
Providence
Queenstown
Rewa
Rockstone
Rose Hall
Stanleytown, Guyana
Santa Rosa
Sawariwau
Saxacalli
Skeldon
Soesdyke
Spring Garden
St. Cuthbert's Mission
St. Ignatius
St. Monica Karawab
Stewartville
Suddie
Supenaam
Surama
Triumph (Regional capital)
Tumatumari
Tuschen
Uitvlugt
Unity Village
Vergenoegen, Region 3, East Bank Essequibo, Guyana
Victoria
Vreed en Hoop (Regional capital)
Vriesland
Yupukari
Wakapau
Weldaad
Windsor Forest
Wowetta
Zeeburg
Zeelandia

Communities

 Abary
 Arakaka
 Bush Lot
 El Paso
 Governor Light
 Jonestown
 Long Creek
 Mora Point
 Noitgedacht
 Orinduik
 Princeville
 Silver Hill
 Tumatumari Landing

Estates
Catherinas Lust
Dadanawa Ranch
Wichabai

Missions
Bethany village
Paruima
Santa Mission

See also 

 Lists of cities by country

References

External links 

 World Gazetteer: Guyana Maps

 
Guyana
Cities
Guyana